Timo Hammel (born 27 August 1987) is a German footballer who plays as a goalkeeper for GSV Maichingen.

External links

1987 births
Living people
VfB Stuttgart II players
FC St. Gallen players
SSV Reutlingen 05 players
Association football goalkeepers
3. Liga players
German footballers